Hallsville High School may refer to:

Hallsville High School (Missouri) in Hallsville, Missouri
Hallsville High School (Texas) in Hallsville, Texas